Henri Pernot du Breuil (24 February 1899 – 11 September 1982) was a French equestrian. He competed at the 1928 Summer Olympics and the 1936 Summer Olympics.

References

1899 births
1982 deaths
French male equestrians
Olympic equestrians of France
Equestrians at the 1928 Summer Olympics
Equestrians at the 1936 Summer Olympics
People from Mirecourt
Sportspeople from Vosges (department)
20th-century French people